Ascalenia kabulella is a moth in the family Cosmopterigidae. It is found in Afghanistan.

The wingspan is 7.1-8.8 mm.

References

Moths described in 1969
Ascalenia
Moths of Asia